The ANAPROF Clausura 2007 season (officially "Torneo Clausura 2007") started on August 3, 2007. On December 2, 2007 the Clausura 2007 finalized with San Francisco F.C. crowned four-time ANAPROF champion after beating Arabe Unido on penalties. Therefore both San Francisco F.C. and Arabe Unido will participate in the Copa Interclubes UNCAF 2008.

Changes for Clausura 2007
Since only seven clubs inscribed for the Primera A (while eight are required by the regulations), the second level is not played and there will be no promotion or relegation at the end of the 2007 season.

Teams

Standings

Results table

Final round

Semifinals 1st Leg (Semifinales - Juego de ida)

Semifinals 2nd Leg (Semifinales - Juego de vuelta)

San Francisco advances to final 4-3 on penalties

Final

San Francisco qualified for 2008–09 CONCACAF Champions League.

Top goalscorers

Goalscorers by team

Local derby statistics

El Super Clasico Nacional - Tauro v Plaza Amador

Clasico del Pueblo - Plaza Amador v Chorillo

Derbi Interiorano - Atlético Chiriquí v Atlético Veragüense

ANAPROF seasons
1
Pan